External pterygoid can refer to:
 Lateral pterygoid muscle (external pterygoid muscle) 
 Lateral pterygoid nerve (external pterygoid nerve) 
 Marcus Gunn phenomenon (external pterygoid-levator synkinesis)